Pastured poultry is a sustainable agriculture technique that calls for the raising of laying chickens, meat chickens (broilers), guinea fowl, and/or turkeys on pasture, as opposed to indoor confinement. Humane treatment and the perceived health benefits of pastured poultry are causing an increase in demand for such products.

Joel Salatin of Swoope, Virginia, helped to reintroduce the technique at Polyface Farm, and wrote his book Pastured Poultry Profits to spread the idea to other farmers. Andy Lee and Herman Beck-Chenoweth expanded on Salatin's techniques, and created some of their own.

The American Pastured Poultry Producers' Association (APPPA) was formed to promote pastured poultry. Its membership consists
largely of pastured poultry farmers.

Though pasture feeding improves the nutritive quality of ruminant meats, the effect of pasture feeding on poultry meat composition is not well established. One trial showed low impact of pasture feeding on vitamin E and fatty acid composition.

The pens that house the fowl can be made from wood and scrap metal or out of PVC pipe and white tarps.

Pastured poultry is also gaining popularity because it helps the farmer, through reducing capital costs, and increasing pasture fertility. It is very well suited for incorporation within a system of managed intensive grazing.

Pastured poultry is not limited to chickens and turkeys. It includes a variety of other birds, including ducks, geese, and exotics in the poultry family.

In the United States, "pastured poultry" or "pasture-raised" claims for poultry are not defined by the United States Department of Agriculture. Because there is no legal definition of the term, producers are not required to verify their claims on food packaging, as long as they are not misleading.

Free-range poultry

Herman Beck-Chenoweth reintroduced the free-range system that was the most popular way to raise poultry in the U.S. from the 1930s through the 1960s.  The system allows birds to range freely during the day and be safely sequestered on secure skid houses over night.  The addition of a guard animal, such as a Komondor or Anatolian Shepherd dog, controls predators.  In the modern American free-range poultry production system, birds are much less crowded and freer to practice normal bird behaviour than in any other pasture-based system.

Although frequently listed as a "pasture" method, free-"range" refers to the length of the forage.  Cattle graze "pasture" which is forage over six inches long.  "Range" refers to short forage of 2-4 inches.  Free-range is a very sustainable production system that improves the farmer's soil and produces poultry with strong bones and meat with good "mouthfeel".  Combined with proper aging after slaughter, the meat is tender and flavorful.

See also
Chickens as pets
Chicken tractor
Free range
Free-range eggs
Grass-fed beef
Heritage turkey
Organic eggs

External links
 poultryOne's Guide to Raising Pastured Poultry
 American Pastured Poultry Producer's Association
 Alternative Poultry Production Systems and Outdoor Access, from ATTRA - National Sustainable Agriculture Information Service
 RichSoil Article on Raising Chickens
 Permies.com Thread About Raising Chickens
 Pastured Poultry Farms Listing
 Poultry and Eggs Overview, Labels Unwrapped

References

Animal feed
Animal welfare
Poultry farming
Sustainable agriculture